The 2019 Nigerian House of Representatives elections in Ebonyi State was held on February 23, 2019, to elect members of the House of Representatives to represent Ebonyi State, Nigeria.

Overview

Summary

Results

Abakaliki/Izzi 
A total of 11 candidates registered with the Independent National Electoral Commission to contest in the election. PDP candidate Sylvester Ogbaga  won the election, defeating APC Nshii Uchenna Mbam and  other party candidates.

Afikpo North/Afikpo South 
A total of 10 candidates registered with the Independent National Electoral Commission to contest in the election. PDP candidate Iduma Igariwey won the election, defeating APC Anthony Ogbonna Ekoh and  other party candidates.

Ezza North/Ishielu 

A total of 10 candidates registered with the Independent National Electoral Commission to contest in the election. PDP candidate Edwin Anayo won the election, defeating APC Micheal .H. Ifere and  other party candidates.

Ezza South/Ikwo 

A total of 8 candidates registered with the Independent National Electoral Commission to contest in the election. PDP candidate Lazarus Ogbee won the election, defeating APC Chinedu Ogar Nweke and  other party candidates.

Ebonyi/Ohaukwu 

A total of 10 candidates registered with the Independent National Electoral Commission to contest in the election. PDP candidate Chukwuma Nwazunku won the election, defeating APC Peter Oge Ali and  other party candidates.

Ivo-Ohaozara/Onich 

A total of 11 candidates registered with the Independent National Electoral Commission to contest in the election. PDP candidate Livinus Makwe won the election, defeating APC Odii Festus Ifesinachi and  other party candidates.

References 

Ebonyi State House of Representatives elections
House of Representatives
Ebonyi